Kaino Tuovi Lemmikki Kekomäki (born Yrjö-Koskinen; September 17, 1902 - April 8, 1996 Helsinki) was a Finnish lawyer who was elected as the first woman to become a member of the Supreme Administrative Court in 1956. 

With this appointment, Kekomäki became the first woman in the Nordic countries to be a senior judge. In 1960, Kekomäki was the first woman to receive the Finnish White Rose Class I commander. In 1971, she became the Grand Cross of the Finnish Lion, the highest honor of the Order.

References

1902 births
1996 deaths
20th-century women lawyers